Bitkub is a Thailand-based cryptocurrency exchange, operated by Bitkub Online Co., Ltd. under its parent group Bitkub Capital Group Holdings (Bitkub Capital Co., Ltd.). It was founded in 2018 by Jirayut Srupsrisopa, and was among the first exchanges to receive a digital asset license from the country's Securities and Exchange Commission, in 2019. It claims to be the largest cryptocurrency exchange in the country, with a share of 90% of crypto transactions based on 2021 data from regulated exchanges. In November 2021, SCB announced that it would acquire a 51-percent stake in the company for 17.85 billion baht (US$537 million), valuing the company at over $1 billion and making it one of Thailand's first unicorn start-up companies. However, on 25th August 2022, the deal was cancelled. The SCB stated that the reason for cancellation was due to BitKub's ongoing lawsuit with Thailand's Securities and Exchange Commission for the alleged involvement in wash and inside trading.

History
Jirayut Srupsrisopa, the main co-founder of Bitkub and CEO of Bitkub Capital, was one of Thailand's first tech entrepreneurs to enter the cryptocurrency business. He had previously co-founded the Bitcoin wallet operator Coins.co.th (a partner of Philippines-based Coins.ph, which was acquired by Go-Jek in 2019), before leaving to raise funding for Bitkub, which was founded in February 2018 with a registered capital of 50 million baht, backed mainly by mobile operator DTAC. By the end of the year, it had become Thailand's second-largest digital currency exchange, after BX.in.th. It was one of the first four exchanges to receive operating licences from the Securities and Exchange Commission (SEC), in January 2019, when the Ministry of Finance began regulating digital asset services.

The company reported rapid growth in revenue, from 3 million baht in 2018 to 30 million and 300 million over the next two years, and 3.28 billion during the first three quarters of 2021. It benefited from the abrupt closure of BX.in.th in 2019, and the rush into cryptocurrency trading as the price of Bitcoin surged from late 2020, but the spike in activity overwhelmed its systems, causing multiple crashes in January 2021, prompting the exchange to temporary shutdown; the SEC ordered rectification of the issues. The SEC also ordered a suspension of new user registration until the company could demonstrate the resilience of its systems, which was lifted in April. In May, the company introduced its own cryptocurrency, Bitkub Coin (KUB).

In November 2021, Siam Commercial Bank Group announced an acquisition deal in which it would (pending regulatory approval) acquire a 51-percent stake in Bitkub Online for 17.85 billion baht ($535 million), placing its total valuation at over $1 billion and making it one of Thailand's first unicorn start-up companies. This deal was later scrapped in August 2022, with Siam Commcercial Bank Group abandoning this due to unresolved regulatory issues.

The company has announced plans for international expansion in Southeast Asia.

It was fined a total of 3.9 million baht for eight infractions including system outages and disruptions, violating trading rules, insufficient customer support, insufficient market surveillance, improper customer asset storage, and improper compliance system.

References

Digital currency exchanges
Financial services companies of Thailand
2018 establishments in Thailand